This article provides information on candidates who stood for the 1914 Australian federal election. The election was held on 5 September 1914.

By-elections, appointments and defections

By-elections and appointments
On 22 December 1913, Hugh Mahon (Labor) was declared elected unopposed as the member for Kalgoorlie, succeeding Charlie Frazer (Labor).
On 10 January 1914, George Edwin Yates (Labor) was elected to replace Ernest Roberts (Labor) as the member for Adelaide.

Retiring Members and Senators

Liberal
 Agar Wynne MP (Balaclava, Vic)

House of Representatives
Sitting members at the time of the election are shown in bold text.
Successful candidates are highlighted in the relevant colour. Where there is possible confusion, an asterisk (*) is also used.

New South Wales

Queensland

South Australia

Tasmania

Victoria

Western Australia

Senate
Sitting Senators are shown in bold text. As this was a double dissolution election, all senators were up for re-election. Tickets that elected at least one Senator are highlighted in the relevant colour. Successful candidates are identified by an asterisk (*).

New South Wales
Six seats were up for election. The Labor Party was defending three seats. The Liberal Party was defending three seats.

Queensland
Six seats were up for election. The Labor Party was defending six seats.

South Australia
Six seats were up for re-election. The Labor Party was defending six seats.

 Labor had only five candidates because Senator Gregor McGregor had re-nominated but died after the close of nominations. As electors had to cast six votes, Labor directed the sixth vote to Shannon, who was elected with over 95% of the vote.

Tasmania
Six seats were up for election. The Labor Party was defending three seats. The Liberal Party was defending three seats.

Victoria
Six seats were up for election. The Labor Party was defending five seats. The Liberal Party was defending one seat.

Western Australia
Six seats were up for election. The Labor Party was defending six seats.

See also
 1914 Australian federal election
 Members of the Australian House of Representatives, 1913–1914
 Members of the Australian House of Representatives, 1914–1917
 Members of the Australian Senate, 1913–1914
 Members of the Australian Senate, 1914–1917
 List of political parties in Australia

References
Adam Carr's Election Archive - House of Representatives 1914
Adam Carr's Election Archive - Senate 1914

1914 in Australia
Candidates for Australian federal elections